Matias Archibald Ranillo III (born October 5, 1956), also known by his screen name Mat Ranillo III is a Filipino-born American actor.

Personal life
Matias Archibald Ranillo III is the second of seven children and the first son of actors Mat Ranillo Jr. and Gloria Sevilla. He has 6 siblings including; actress Suzette Ranillo and musician Dandin Ranillo. He attended Lourdes School in Quezon city and spent his high school years between St. Vincent School in Dipolog and San Sebastian College. He studied Customs Administration in San Beda College, where he also played for the basketball team.

After years away from showbusiness, Ranillo was implicated in the Pork Barrel Scam.

Filmography

Film

Television

Stage

References

External links
 

1956 births
Living people
20th-century Filipino male actors
21st-century Filipino male actors
Filipino male film actors
Filipino male stage actors
Filipino male television actors
Mat
San Beda University alumni